The name Mangkhut has been used for two tropical cyclones in the Western Pacific Ocean. The name was submitted by Thailand, and refers to the mangosteen tree. It replaced Durian.

 Tropical Storm Mangkhut (2013) (T1310, 10W, Kiko) – a weak storm that landfall in Northern Vietnam.
 Typhoon Mangkhut (2018) (T1822, 26W, Ompong) – a destructive Category 5 super typhoon that made landfall in Cagayan, Philippines, and subsequently impacted Hong Kong and southern China.

Mangkhut was retired after the 2018 typhoon season and replaced with Krathon, which refers to the santol fruit.

Pacific typhoon set index articles